Stephanie Cotter (born 27 January 1999) is an Irish athlete who specialises in the 1500 metres. Her personal bests are 4:14.96 in the 1500 m and 2:09.23 in the 800 m. Cotter won bronze 2019 European Cross Country Championships. She finished sixth at the 2021 European U23 Championships in Tallinn and has won multiple Irish Championship titles. Cotter was supported by West Muskerry Athletic Club as a youth.

Biography
Stephanie Cotter was born in Cork, Ireland. Cotter was born to Sheila & Michael. Sheila Cotter, Mom, is a physical education & science high school teacher & Michael Cotter, dad, is a physical therapist. Both parents ran when they were younger, dad went to University of Michigan on Michigan Wolverines track and field scholarship in 1980s. Stephanie Cotter has two younger sisters, Jennifer & Shannon.

International competition

Domestic Championships

NCAA

References

External links
 
  (Track Field Results Reporting System)
 Stephanie Cotter cross country profile at Adams State Grizzlies
 Stephanie Cotter track and field profile at Adams State Grizzlies
 DyeStat Discussions - EP311 - Stephanie Cotter at runnerspace.com

1999 births
Living people
Irish female middle-distance runners
Adams State Grizzlies women's track and field athletes
Sportspeople from Cork (city)